Ronald David Fisher (7 August 1911 – 14 June 1993) was an Australian rules footballer who played with St Kilda in the Victorian Football League (VFL).

Fisher, a ruckman originally from Port Melbourne, played in the seconds at South Melbourne then Footscray, before coming to St Kilda in 1933. He made six senior appearances for St Kilda that year and remained a regular fixture in the team until 1938. Cleared to Ararat in 1939, Fisher was the club's coach for two seasons.

He was the younger brother of South Melbourne and St Kilda footballer Clem Fisher.

References

1911 births
1993 deaths
Australian rules footballers from Melbourne
St Kilda Football Club players
Port Melbourne Football Club players
Ararat Football Club players
People from South Melbourne